Raquel Prado (born 1970) is a Venezuelan Bayesian statistician. She is a professor of statistics in the Jack Baskin School of Engineering of the University of California, Santa Cruz, and has been elected president of the International Society for Bayesian Analysis for the 2019 term.

Contributions
Prado specializes in Bayesian inference for time series data. With Mike West, she is the author of the book Time Series: Modeling, Computation, and Inference (Texts in Statistical Science, CRC Press, 2010).

Education and career
Prado was born on April 24, 1970 in Caracas,
and graduated from Simón Bolívar University in 1993.
She completed her Ph.D. in statistics at Duke University in 1998. Her dissertation, Latent Structure in Non-Stationary Time Series, was supervised by Mike West.

After completing her Ph.D. she returned to Simón Bolívar University as a faculty member before moving to Santa Cruz.

Recognition
In 1999, Prado and her co-authors Andrew Krystal and Mike West won the Outstanding Statistical Application Award of the American Statistical Association for their work on statistical analysis of electroencephalography data.
In 2013, Prado became a Fellow of the American Statistical Association.

References

External links
Home page

1970 births
Living people
American statisticians
Venezuelan statisticians
Women statisticians
Duke University alumni
University of California, Santa Cruz faculty
Fellows of the American Statistical Association
Academic staff of Simón Bolívar University (Venezuela)
Venezuelan women educators